Gara Choqa or Garachoqa or Gara Cheqa or Garachqa may refer to:
 Gara Choqa, Hamadan
 Gara Choqa, Nahavand, Hamadan Province
 Garachoqa, Kurdistan